Dave Sirulnick (born May 26, 1964) is an American television producer.

Sirulnick grew up in Teaneck, New Jersey, where he attended Teaneck High School and became involved with booking musicians such as LL Cool J, Run DMC, and Salt-N-Pepa at The Rink, a roller rink in nearby Bergenfield. He later attended Rutgers University. After graduating, he was hired as a news producer at CNN, like his father who was also a television producer.

In 1987, he joined MTV, saying they "wanted someone to grow their news department. It's what I wanted my whole life: TV, music and news". He eventually became the executive vice president for Multiplatform Production, News and Music at MTV. Sirulnick's responsibilities included oversight of MTV's signature show, Total Request Live. Half of MTV's programming had been within his job functions. He was the chief architect of the MTV Video Music Awards. In March 2015, he and others were dismissed from their positions at MTV by Viacom, the parent corporation.

, Sirulnick is a partner at RadicalMedia.

Television and film credits

References

External links

Living people
Teaneck High School alumni
American television producers
Rutgers University alumni
MTV executives
1964 births